Cheb Sahraoui (born Mohamed Sahraoui, Tlemcen, Algeria, 1 April 1961) is an Algerian raï musician, the first to tour North America and the first to incorporate electronic synthesizers into his arrangements.

Early life
As a pianist, he studied music at the conservatory of music in Oran, and launched his musical career by singing raï classics and Beatles tunes in the city's nightclubs.  His first hit, "Ana Mahlali Noum", was released in 1978.

Career
In 1983 he married singer Fadela Zalmat, known as Chaba Fadela, and the pair began recording as a duo.  Their first record together, "N'sel Fik", became an international hit, and was followed by further record successes and tours, including tours of the USA in 1990 and 1993.  While in New York they recorded the album "Walli" with producer and multi-instrumentalist Bill Laswell.  They relocated from Algeria to France in 1994.

In the late 1990s, Sahraoui and Fadela separated.  Sahraoui's debut solo album, Un Homme Libre (A Free Man), was released in 2000.

Further information and main sources
[  AMG entry]
 Further information

1961 births
Living people
Raï musicians
People from Tlemcen
20th-century Algerian  male  singers
21st-century Algerian  male singers